Netherlands competes at the 2015 Summer Universiade in Gwangju, South Korea.

Medal by sports

Medalists

References
 Country overview: Netherlands on the official website

2015 in Dutch sport
Nations at the 2015 Summer Universiade
Netherlands at the Summer Universiade